Médard Albrand (8 June 1898 in Petit-Canal, Guadeloupe – 26 July 1981 in Paris) was a politician from Guadeloupe who served in the French National Assembly from 1958 to 1967.

References 

1898 births
1981 deaths
People from Petit-Canal
Rally of the French People politicians
Union for the New Republic politicians
Guadeloupean politicians
French people of Guadeloupean descent
Deputies of the 1st National Assembly of the French Fifth Republic
Deputies of the 2nd National Assembly of the French Fifth Republic